Bomitaba (Mbomitaba) is a Bantu language of the Republic of Congo, with a couple hundred speakers in the Central African Republic.

Maho (2009) lists the C141 Enyele (Inyele), C142 Bondongo, and C142 Mbonzo (Impfondo) languages, which do not have ISO codes, as being closest to Bomitaba.

References

Ngondi-Ngiri languages